North Vermillion High School is a public high school located in Cayuga, Indiana.

Athletics
North Vermillion High School's athletic teams are the Falcons and they compete in the Wabash River Conference. The school offers a wide range of athletics including:

Baseball
Basketball
Cheerleading
Cross Country
Football
Golf
Softball
Swimming
Track
Volleyball
Wrestling

Football
The 2014-2015 football team went 15-0 and won the 2014-15 IHSAA 1A Football State Championship against the Pioneer Panthers (27-26) on November 29, 2014. The 2018-2019 Falcons football team went 13-2 and made the IHSAA 1A State Championship, losing to the Pioneer Panthers (60-0).

Basketball
The 2001-2002 Women's basketball team went 25-1 overall and won the IHSAA 1A Girls Basketball State Championship against the Hebron Hawks (45-42) on March 2, 2002. The Lady Falcons were the State Runner-Up for the 2002–2003 season.

See also
 List of high schools in Indiana

References

External links
 Official Website

Buildings and structures in Vermillion County, Indiana
Public high schools in Indiana
Education in Vermillion County, Indiana